From Saigon to Dien Bien Phu (Vietnamese: Từ Sài Gòn tới Điện Biên Phủ) All quiet on the Saigon front or Saigon out of war is a 1970 Vietnamese 35mm Eastmancolor film directed by Lê Mộng Hoàng.

Plot
The Joint Chiefs of Staff want to send some ARVNSF troops to North's Điện Biên Phủ for the Dien Bien Phu Operation. But all have been caught or killed by Chinese spies as Kiều Loan (Kiều Chinh), except Major Ngọc Minh (Lê Quỳnh).

Production
The locations are Saigon, Hong Kong and Taipei in 1970.

Art

 Studio: Mỹ Vân Films, Asia Motion Pictures Company
 Print: National Centre for Cinema
 Scan: Spectra Films Studio
 Executive producer: Lưu Trạch Hưng
 Producer: Quốc Phong, Nguyễn Tăng Hồng
 Director: Lê Mộng Hoàng
 Writer: Quốc Phong
 Secretary: Lưu Trạch Quang
 Cinematography: Châu Tùng
 Editor: Tăng Thiên Tài
 Composer: Nghiêm Phú Phi

Cast

Vietnam
 Lê Quỳnh as Major Ngọc Minh
 Kiều Chinh as Kiều Loan
 Thẩm Thúy Hằng
 Đoàn Châu Mậu as Colonel Lâm
 Hoàng Vĩnh Lộc
 Khả Năng
 Lê Khanh
 Ngọc Phu
 Trần Khánh
 Phương Dung
Taiwan
 Lin Yi ... Cẩm Hà
 Chen Yang ... Manager Nhân
 Yu Tian
 Yen Chung
Hong Kong
 You Ming
 Cheng Hou
 Lily Chen Ching

and Air Vietnam staff members.

See also
 The Quiet American
 Number Ten Blues

References

 西貢無戰事
 Lê Quang Thanh Tâm, Pre-1975 South Vietnamese Cinema, HochiMinh City Culture and Art Publishing House, Saigon, 2015.
 Tony Williams, John Woo's Bullet in the Head (The New Hong Kong Cinema), Hong Kong University Press, Hong Kong, May 2009.
 From Saigon to Dienbien Fu
 RVN Cinema: Sublimation in the difficulty 
 半世紀前的台灣「舊」南向，是星光燦爛的藝文往事

Vietnamese adventure films
Vietnamese musical films
Vietnamese spy films
Vietnamese thriller films
Vietnamese romance films
Vietnam War films
1970 films